Forsey is a surname. Notable people with the surname include:

 Brock Forsey (born 1980), American football player
 Clayton Forsey (born 1953), politician in Newfoundland and Labrador, Canada
 Dave Forsey, British businessman, CEO of Sports Direct
 Eugene Forsey (1904–1991), served in the Canadian Senate from 1970 to 1979
 Jack Forsey (1913–1998), Canadian ice hockey player
 Keith Forsey (born 1948), English soundtrack composer, drummer, songwriter and record producer

See also 
 Greubel Forsey, watchmaking company specializing in very high-end complicated timepieces. It was launched in 2004 by Robert Greubel and Stephen Forsey and is based in La Chaux-de-Fonds, Switzerland.